Mayall may refer to:

People with the surname Mayall:
James Mayall (1856–1916), British cricketer
John Mayall (born 1933), British blues singer
John Jabez Edwin Mayall (1813–1901), British photographer
Margaret Mayall (1902–1995), American astronomer
Nicholas U. Mayall, a 20th-century astronomer.
Rik Mayall (1958–2014), British comedian and actor
Samuel Mayall (1816–1892), Thirty-third Congress Representative from Maine

Astronomical objects and related 
Mayall II, Mayall III, Mayall IV, Mayall V, and Mayall VI globular clusters in the Andromeda Galaxy
Mayall's Object, or Arp 148, a peculiar galaxy, or pair of colliding galaxies
2131 Mayall, a minor planet
Nicholas U. Mayall Telescope, telescope at the Kitt Peak National Observatory